Microchrysa polita, the black-horned gem, is a species of soldier fly found in Europe, Asia, and North America.

Description
A small species (Body 4.5 to 5.5.mm. long) Antennae black. Legs predominantly black. Pubescence in middle part of mesonotum  and on abdomen black in male.

Biology
The flight period is March to September. Habitats are deciduous woodland edges, wooded areas, hedgerows, gardens, and parks. Larvae have been found in soil, decomposing grass and leaves, and compost.

Distribution
Russia, Siberia, Central Asia, Mongolia, Western Europe, United States, and Canada.

References

Stratiomyidae
Diptera of Europe
Diptera of North America
Flies described in 1758
Taxa named by Carl Linnaeus